Łężce may refer to the following places in Poland:
Łężce, Lower Silesian Voivodeship (south-west Poland)
Łężce, Łódź Voivodeship (central Poland)
Łężce, Greater Poland Voivodeship (west-central Poland)
Łężce, Opole Voivodeship (south-west Poland)